Fist of Legend is a 1994 Hong Kong martial arts film directed and co-written by Gordon Chan, featuring action choreography by Yuen Woo-ping, and produced by Jet Li, who also stars in the lead role of Chen Zhen. It is a remake of the 1972 Bruce Lee film Fist of Fury. 

Set in the Shanghai International Settlement in 1937, the film follows Chen as he investigates his old master Huo Yuanjia's death at the hands of the Imperial Japanese occupation forces. The film co-stars Chin Siu-ho, Yasuaki Kurata, Shinobu Nakayama, Billy Chow and Paul Chun. It was released by Golden Harvest on 22 December 1994.

Plot
In 1937, Chen Zhen is a Chinese martial artist from Shanghai, who attends Kyoto University. Thugs from the ultranationalist Black Dragon Clan burst in and attempt to force him out because he is Chinese. Mitsuko, one of Chen's classmates who is in a romantic relationship with him, along with Chen's professor and classmates, defend his presence. The thugs turn violent but Chen easily defeats them using a variety of controlled Chin Na techniques. The Japanese thugs' sensei, Fumio Funakoshi, who is also Mitsuko's uncle, arrives to take control of the situation and apologizes for his students' behavior. Funakoshi is impressed by Chen's skill and converses with him, and Chen learns that his master, Huo Yuanjia, has died after losing in a match against a Japanese karateka named Akutagawa. Chen is distraught after hearing the bad news and he leaves Kyoto for Shanghai immediately.

Chen returns to Jingwu School and learns that his master's son, Ting'en, has become the new master. The next day, Chen goes to the Japanese dojo to challenge Akutagawa, who honorably accepts. Chen defeats Akutagawa easily and concludes that Akutagawa was not capable of defeating Huo, after which he suspects foul play in his master's death. Chen has Huo's corpse exhumed for an autopsy against the wishes of Ting'en and his fellow Jingwu members. It is revealed that Huo was poisoned and weakened before his match against Akutagawa. Over the next few days, word of Chen's victory against Akutagawa spreads and Chen becomes a local celebrity in Shanghai. The Jingwu members begin to look up to Chen as their new instructor, which incurs the jealousy of Ting'en. Ting'en remains silent and seeks comfort in a brothel, where he becomes romantically involved with a prostitute.

Meanwhile, Akutagawa confronts General Fujita of the Imperial Japanese Army after suspecting that his match against Huo had been rigged, which he considers dishonorable. After a heated argument, Fujita kills Akutagawa by breaking his back in front of the Japanese ambassador, and then places the blame on Chen. Enraged by their master's death, Akutagawa's students attack the Jingwu School, culminating in a fight that is eventually stopped by the local police. Chen is arrested and placed on trial for allegedly murdering Akutagawa. Several bribed witnesses provide false and conflicting accounts of the murder, but the court refuses to accept testimony from any Chinese defense witnesses on the grounds of bias towards Chen. Mitsuko shows up and testifies that Chen is innocent because he spent the night with her, and the court accepts her false testimony because she is Japanese. Chen is exonerated, but his apparent relationship with Mitsuko ruins his reputation because the Chinese view it as an act of betrayal against his fellow Chinese. Ting'en and the senior Jingwu members demand that Chen leaves either Mitsuko or the school. Huo uses the opportunity to settle his personal vendetta against Chen by challenging him to a fight. Although Chen defeats Ting'en, he still chooses to leave with Mitsuko. Huo feels humiliated by his defeat so he gives up his position as master of Jingwu before leaving to join his lover. Jingwu's members eventually discover Huo's relationship with her and reprimand him. Huo learns his lesson and returns to Jingwu.

Chen and Mitsuko face hostility from the locals and are forced to take shelter in an abandoned hut near Huo Yuanjia's grave. At the same time, Funakoshi arrives from Japan, as requested by Fujita, to eliminate Chen. Funakoshi engages Chen in a fight, which ends in a draw and the conclusion that if Chen learns to adapt to his opponent's moves, he will be unbeatable. Funakoshi leaves after warning Chen about Fujita's ill intentions and brutal methods. Days later, Huo Ting'en visits Chen and apologizes for his earlier behavior, saying that Jingwu School accepts Chen and Mitsuko's relationship now. Huo teaches Chen the Mizong Fist that night while Mitsuko leaves secretly, leaving behind a message for Chen that she will wait for him in Japan.

The next day, Chen and Huo confront Fujita at his dojo, where Fujita exposes a traitor from Jingwu who played a role in Huo Yuanjia's death, and shoots him. Huo Ting'en then fights Fujita, who appears to be incredibly strong and resilient, and Huo suffers grave injuries. Chen engages Fujita in a long and exhausting fight, and eventually defeats him. Just as Chen and Huo are about to leave, the enraged Fujita comes after them with a katana. Huo pushes Chen out of the katana's way but is stabbed in the arm, and Chen is forced to kill Fujita. Japanese soldiers surround them and prepare to open fire. The Japanese ambassador, who is a pacifist against rising militarism in his country, arrives and orders his soldiers to stand down. He agrees with Chen's actions as he has been aware that Fujita is a madman, but also warns them that the Japanese government will use Fujita's death as an excuse to start a war with China, unless the Chinese can account for Fujita's death by executing the murderer. Chen expresses his willingness to accept the blame for Fujita's death in order to prevent war, earning the ambassador's further admiration. Instead of ordering Chen's death, the ambassador stages a fake execution and substitutes the dead Jingwu's traitor's body for Chen's. Meanwhile, Chen secretly leaves Shanghai for Manchuria.

Cast

Reception

Box office 
Though Fist of Legend is widely considered one of Li's best films, during the downturn period of the Hong Kong film industry, its HK$14,785,382 box office gross was considered a disappointment. By comparison, Li's Fong Sai-yuk grossed over HK$30 million, and Fong Sai-yuk II grossed HK$23 million. However, its overall box office from other countries was good.

In South Korea, the film sold 181,760 tickets in Seoul City.

Critical response 
The film holds a 100% rating on Rotten Tomatoes.

Television 
In the United Kingdom, the film (released as Jet Li's Fist of Legend) was watched by  viewers on television in 2004, making it the year's seventh most-watched foreign-language film on television (below six other Hong Kong action films).

Alternate versions

Miramax
The English-dubbed U.S. release by Miramax and Buena Vista Distribution contains four specific mistranslations that drastically alter the meaning of the film as a whole.

 Before Chen leaves Japan, Mitsuko asks him if he hates the Japanese. In the U.S. version he replies, "I don't hate." In the Hong Kong version he replies, "I don't know."
 In the U.S. version of the scene where Chen fights Fumio, Fumio asks him what the most effective way to defeat an enemy is. Chen replies that the most effective way is to focus one's energy and strike, and Fumio agrees with him. In the Hong Kong version, they begin by discussing their match. Chen says that the purpose of martial arts is to defeat an enemy. Fumio says, "No, you're wrong. The best way to defeat your enemy is to use a gun. Martial arts is about personal development." The original line was a nod to Bruce Lee, who was quoted during the production of Enter the Dragon as "Nowadays you don't go around on the street kicking people, punching people — because if you do (makes gun shape with hand), well that's it — I don't care how good you are."
 Prior to the final fight sequence in the U.S. version, Chen and Huo face Fujita who holds up a sign reading Dongya Bingfu (東亞病夫) and he tells them that the sign says, "Jingwu is closed". The Chinese characters are commonly translated to "Sick men of the East" and is used as a famous reference to Fist of Fury. The subtitles in the Hong Kong version translate the sign correctly.
 At the end in the U.S. version, Chen's driver asks him if he will go to be with Mitsuko. Chen responds, "If I no longer have a country, at least I can still be with the woman I love." His response in the Hong Kong version is, "Where is war with Japan most likely to break out?" The driver says, "Manchuria" and he says, "We'll go to Manchuria then."

With regard to footage, this version deletes the final moments of students training and contains a brand new set of opening (animated) and closing credits in English, abandoning the previous ones completely.

Taiwan
Compared to the Hong Kong version, the 106-minute Mandarin-dubbed Taiwanese version contains the following footage:

 An extension to the scene where Fujita gives a harsh lecture to several men, prior to his order to spy on certain Japanese individuals.
 An extension of the scene with Chen after bowing to his master's shrine where Liu Zhensheng then hands over a suitcase to Chen and the latter proceeds to leave. Prior to following him, Mitsuko also respectfully bows.
 An entire scene where Hill Hung is looking for Huo Ting'en at a brothel, only to find him smoking opium with a prostitute.
 An entire scene where Hill Hung brings tea to Huo Ting'en, the night prior to the final match.
 An extension of Fumio talking with the ambassador, prior to the former winning the Renju game.
 After the final fight ends, a very small extension sees the Japanese soldiers pause for a moment prior to entering the Dojo.

In the Mandarin soundtracks of the film, there is background music when Chen fights Huo. However, in the Cantonese soundtrack, the music only plays after Chen performs a Capoeira-style kick later on in the fight.

Hong Kong
The Hong Kong version in return, has the following unique footage:

 A reaction shot of the cook in the kitchen (followed by a shot from Huo Yuanjia's shrine) after Uncle Nong dispatches students to search for Huo Ting'en.
 A few seconds of Chen Zhen feigning death to Fujita.
 After the credits finish, we see the crew waving to the camera.

Both Hong Kong and Taiwanese version have slightly different end credits.

Home media

DVD

Ritek
In 1997, the first DVD was released by Ritek in Taiwan, which fans later reported to be an "uncut" version. This has been a widely held misconception - whilst this version does carry some more footage (as a Taiwanese version), it is in turn missing a few moments that the Hong Kong version has.

Miramax
On 15 February 2000, Miramax issued a DVD of this film in the U.S. (later in the U.K. too by Hollywood Pictures on VHS first, then DVD later on 29 March 2002). Whilst it featured better visual quality than any other release (some agree even to this day), it immediately caused an uproar with the Hong Kong Cinema fan community because it contained only a new English dub/score with alterations to the original dialogue and no original Cantonese option - a defect shared with many of their Hong Kong-acquired titles (not to mention the edits).

HKVideo
On 20 March 2002, the first official DVD of the Hong Kong version with a Cantonese soundtrack was issued by HKVideo in France. However, it contained no English subtitles. One notable difference to other versions carrying a Chinese/Taiwanese version is that it doesn't contain the ending text describing the aftermath of Jingwu School, but is otherwise the same and, bar a few missing frames, uncut.

Maxam
A lesser-known DVD was issued on 25 March 2005 by Japanese distributor Maxam which contains the Hong Kong version (and its ending text) in complete form, but no English subtitles.

Dragon Dynasty
A R1 2-DVD "Ultimate Edition" was finally released on 9 September 2008 from The Weinstein Company's Dragon Dynasty label in America, which features many extras and the original Cantonese soundtrack with English subtitles, marking the first official DVD release to do so. This version was also released in Australia (Region 4), in single disk.

However, this is still visually the previous US version with the Cantonese soundtrack edited to fit its visuals. Matters are worsened when the subtitles revert to dubtitles towards the end - relying on the previous incorrectly transcribed "Sick Men Of Asia" sign and story-changing ending (see above) from Miramax's English dub.

New Age 21/HMH
German-issued DVDs from distributor 'New Age 21' (released 12 November 2008) and 'HMH' (released 20 November 2008) were released in an uncut state and contain a Cantonese soundtrack with English subtitles.

Other releases
Other uncut English-subtitled releases of the Hong Kong Cantonese-language versions (now OOP) include the US Tai Seng VHS (released 20 October 2000), the Australian Chinatown Video VHS, the U.K. Made in Hong Kong VHS (released 1 October 1999), and the Mei Ah VCD, VHS and LD.

The Malaysian Speedy VCD also contains a similar version, but enforces cuts to some scenes for violence:

 Fujita kneeing Ryōichi Akutagawa's back.
 Huo Ting'en hitting his head on a window during the finale.
 Chen Zhen hitting his head on a window during the finale.

The Spanish Manga Films DVD titled El Mejor Luchador (released 24 October 2001) and a slightly edited Indian Diskovery VCD titled The Hitter: Fist of the Legend contain an English-dubbed version intended for export to English-speaking territories. Strangely, this version has aired occasionally on US TV with a Miramax ident instead of their own produced version.

Blu-ray
Cine Asia released a Blu-ray version 22 March 2010 in the UK and on 20 April 2010 in USA.

Legacy 
Fist of Legend inspired the Wachowskis to hire choreographer Yuen Woo-ping for the fight scenes in The Matrix (1999). The style of fighting in the two films bears some resemblance.

In 1996, an unofficial sequel titled Fists of Legends 2: Iron Bodyguards was released starring Jet Le (not Jet Li).

Later films have also been influenced by Fist of Legend. Hitman contains a scene involving the main character using a belt as a weapon as seen in Fist of Legend. The more realistic and less wire-driven fight choreography seen in Kiss of the Dragon was a result of fan criticism to Corey Yuen's choreography in Romeo Must Die and preference for the style seen in Fist of Legend.

In 2006, Jet Li played his character's teacher, Huo Yuanjia, in Fearless.

In 2010, Gordon Chan and Andrew Lau produced a continuation of this film named Legend of the Fist: The Return of Chen Zhen with Donnie Yen as Chen Zhen in his thirties.

See also
 Jet Li filmography

References

External links
 
 
 
 Fist of Legend at BLACK BELT TV The Martial Arts Network
 Dragon Dynasty's Fist Of Legend page
(Wayback Machine copy)
 A further examination between the differences of Fist Of Fury and Fist Of Legend
 A DVD image comparison between Dimension, Dragon Dynasty and HKVideo
Kung Fu Cinema's review
(Wayback Machine copy)
Kung Fu Cinema's review of the Dragon Dynasty DVD
(Wayback Machine copy)
 DVD comparison list
 Pictured differences between the Hong Kong and Taiwanese versions (in German)
 Fist of Legend Movie Synopsis
(Wayback Machine copy)
 Martiallife review of Fist of Legend

1994 films
1994 martial arts films
1990s Cantonese-language films
1990s Hong Kong films
1990s Japanese-language films
Films about race and ethnicity
Films about racism
Films directed by Gordon Chan
Films set in Japan
Films set in Kyoto
Films set in Shanghai
Golden Harvest films
Hong Kong films about revenge
Hong Kong martial arts films
Jeet Kune Do films
Kung fu films
Remakes of Hong Kong films
Second Sino-Japanese War films
Wushu films